Kwesten is a Papuan language of Indonesia.

It is spoken in Arare, Holmhaven, Mafenter, and Omte villages in Sarmi Regency.

References

Languages of western New Guinea
Orya–Tor languages